Good Morning Beautiful is an album by the Canadian indie rock band By Divine Right, released in 2001 on Linus Entertainment.

The album was produced by José Miguel Contreras, João Carvalho, and Andy Magoffin.

Critical reception
AllMusic called Good Morning Beautiful "a trendless, timeless classic rock and pop album." The Ottawa Citizen called it "a focused and sunny collection of upbeat pop songs, less pretty and with more of a rock edge than Bless This Mess."

Track listing
All songs written by José Miguel Contreras, except "Back to You" by Contreras and Gordon Downie.
 Dedication
 Supernatural
 Soul Explosion
 Stella Heart Ocean
 Powersuit
 Sweet Lovin'
 Angels
 Hugger of Trees
 Medicine
 One More City
 Kick This Bummer
 Back to You

References

2001 albums
By Divine Right albums